City Hill is a park located in Canberra, Australia on one of the points of the Parliamentary Triangle, a feature of Walter Burley Griffin's plan for the city. The park is surrounded by Vernon Circle, at the south end of Northbourne Avenue, but beyond Vernon Circle it is further surrounded by the concentric London Circuit, and the area between Vernon Circle and London Circuit (which is partly built up) can also be seen as part of the hill. City Hill is an integral part of the city centre design. To the south of the hill Northbourne Avenue becomes Commonwealth Avenue, and further along is Commonwealth Avenue bridge. 

The hill was planted in 1921. The design, supervised by Charles Weston, Canberra's first Superintendent of Parks and Gardens, was to emphasise the vistas along the six avenues radiating from the hill and reinforce the focus that Griffin placed on the hill as forming part of the Parliamentary triangle. At the centre of the hill is a flagpole flying the ACT flag since 1989 when the territory became self-governing. Immediately surrounding the flagpole are double staggered rows of closely spaced Roman cypresses (Cupressus sempervirens Stricta). Radiating outwards are twelve oval shaped groups of Roman cypresses and six groups of Monterey pines (Pinus radiata) reinforcing the symmetrical nature of the design. In 2014 the Canberra Centenary Column was added to the park, to commemorate Canberra's centenary.

The park is centrally located and well-known, but it is rarely visited as it is away from shops and public areas and is difficult to access because it is surrounded by a major road. The prominent flagpole at the centre of Vernon Circle is not actually at the highest point of City Hill. The highest point of City Hill is to the south east, overlooking Lake Burley Griffin.  Unusually for the centre of a large city and as a result of the relative isolation of City Hill, a small variety of mushrooms can be found growing under the pine trees.

References

External links 

ACT Planning & Land Authority: City Hill …a concept for the future

Parks in Canberra
Australian Capital Territory Heritage Register